Dharma Teja is a 1989 Indian Telugu-language film directed by Perala and produced by Sainath. It stars Krishnam Raju, Sharada, Raadhika and Vani Viswanath. The music was composed by Vidyasagar. The film was a remake of Tamil film Poonthotta Kaavalkaaran.

Cast
Krishnam Raju as Dharma Teja
Sharada
Raadhika
Vani Viswanath

Soundtrack

The music and background score for the film were composed by Vidyasagar. All songs were written by Sirivennela Seetharama Sastry.

Track listing

References

External links

1988 films
Indian drama films
Films scored by Vidyasagar
1980s Telugu-language films
Telugu remakes of Tamil films